Morris Lolar (born February 18, 1970) is an American gridiron football coach and former player.  He is the defensive backs coach for Montreal Alouettes of the Canadian Football League (CFL). the Lolar served as the head football coach at Bethel College in North Newton, Kansas from 2015 to 2017, compiling a record of 7–23.

Lolar began his college football playing career at the University of Minnesota before transferring to Friends University in Wichita, Kansas. He played for all or part of five CFL seasons, first with the Edmonton Eskimos and then with the Winnipeg Blue Bombers.

Head coaching record

References

External links
 Montreal Alouettes profile
 Defiance profile

1970 births
Living people
American football defensive backs
Bethel Threshers football coaches
Defiance Yellow Jackets football coaches
Edmonton Elks players
Friends Falcons football players
Minnesota Golden Gophers football players
Montreal Alouettes coaches
Winnipeg Blue Bombers players
Sportspeople from Lawrence, Kansas
Players of American football from Kansas
African-American coaches of American football
African-American coaches of Canadian football
African-American players of American football
African-American players of Canadian football
21st-century African-American sportspeople
20th-century African-American sportspeople